This is a list of parliaments in Trinidad and Tobago.

See also
 Parliament of Trinidad and Tobago

References

Government of Trinidad and Tobago
Trinidad and Tobago-related lists